Tika Lal Taploo  (1930 – 14 September 1989) was an advocate and politician from Jammu and Kashmir

Early life and education
Taploo was born in Srinagar in a Kashmiri Pandit family. He graduated from Panjab University and done his Masters in Arts and LLB from Aligarh Muslim University.

In later life, he practised as an advocate in Jammu and Kashmir High Court and engaged in political activity. He was the vice-president of Bharatiya Janata Party in Jammu and Kashmir and also an active member of the Rashtriya Swayamsevak Sangh, a Hindu nationalist paramilitary organisation. He stood for several elections to the Jammu and Kashmir Legislative Assembly, however he was never elected, reportedly due to the gerrymandering of his electoral constituency. He had a large following as a social and political activist.

Death
On 14 September 1989, Taploo was assassinated by the JKLF militants at his home in Srinagar. His funeral was attended by many senior leaders including BJP leader Lal Krishna Advani and Kidar Nath Sahani.

In September 2022, the Supreme Court of India declined to consider a petition requesting an investigation into the murder of Tika Lal Taploo in the Kashmir valley in 1989. The bench of Justices Bhushan Ramkrishna Gavai and C. T. Ravikumar declined to hear the matter, stating that they had not entertained a similar case recently. The petition was submitted by Ashutosh Taploo, the son of Tika Lal Taploo.

In popular culture 
Tika Lal Taploo's story is featured in the 2022 Hindi film The Kashmir Files directed by Vivek Agnihotri, which revisits the killings of Kashmiri Pandits in 1989 and is based on true events. Taploo's story, as one of the first major killings in the conflict, is prominently featured in the film.

In March 2022, a North Delhi municipal school was renamed after Taploo. Amid raging debate across the country after the movie The Kashmir Files screening, BJP-led Delhi Municipal Corporation renamed a school as 'Shaheed Tika Lal Taploo' in the Rohini area in sector 7-B.

See also
1986 Anantnag Riots
Exodus of Kashmiri Hindus

References

External links
On This Day In 1989 One Of The Biggest Leaders Of Kashmiri Pandits, Tika Lal Taploo Was Killed By Militants
How killing of this Kashmiri Hindu leader led to exodus of Pandits from Valley
BJP pays rich tributes to Tika Lal Taploo
Kashmiri Pandits observe 'Martyrs Day' to mark killing of Tika Lal Taploo

1930 births
1989 deaths
1989 murders in Asia
20th-century Indian lawyers
Indian people of Kashmiri descent
Kashmiri people
Kashmiri Hindus
Kashmiri Pandits
Persecution of Hindus
Persecution by Muslims
People from Jammu and Kashmir
People murdered in Jammu and Kashmir
Bharatiya Janata Party politicians from Jammu and Kashmir
Aligarh Muslim University alumni